Barney McAuley (born 1982) is an Irish hurler who played as a right corner-back for the Antrim senior team.

McAuley made his first appearance for the team during the 2003 National League and was a regular member of the starting fifteen until his retirement after the 2007 championship. During that time he won one Christy Ring Cup winners' medal and one Ulster winners' medal.

At club level McAuley is an All-Ireland medalist with Loughgiel Shamrocks. In addition to this he has also won back-to-back Ulster and county club championship winners' medals.

References

1982 births
Living people
Loughgiel Shamrocks hurlers
Antrim inter-county hurlers
Ulster inter-provincial hurlers